Dx - Diagnosis,
Sx - Symptoms,
Fx - Fracture,
Tx - Treatment,
Hx - History
S/b-seen by

Lists of medical abbreviations